Alma Gol Lake, also called Lake Ulmagol, is a freshwater lake in Golestān Province, Iran near the Turkmenistan border.

The population of catfish (Silurus glanis) in the lake has drastically decreased because of increasing population growth among the villagers.

Alma Gol is a winter habitat for migratory birds.  In 1975, the Alma Gol Lake and nearby Ala Gol and Aji Gol Lakes were designated as a wetland of international importance under the Ramsar Convention.

References

External links 
Freshwater Fishes of Iran by Brian Coad

Lakes of Iran
Ramsar sites in Iran
Landforms of Golestan Province